The Broadway Sport is a 1917 American silent comedy film directed by Carl Harbaugh and starring Stuart Holmes, Wanda Hawley, Dan Mason, Mabel Rutter, and William B. Green. The film was released by Fox Film Corporation on June 10, 1917.

Plot

Cast
Stuart Holmes as Hezekiah Dill
Wanda Hawley as Sadie Sweet (as Wanda Petit)
Dan Mason as Hector Sweet
Mabel Rutter as Violet Gaffney
William B. Green as John D. Boulder (as W.B. Green)
J. Sullivan as His Counselor
Mario Majeroni as The Hypnotist
Jay Wilson as Plain Clothesman

Preservation
The film is now considered lost.

See also
List of lost films
1937 Fox vault fire

References

External links

1917 comedy films
Silent American comedy films
1917 films
American silent feature films
American black-and-white films
Fox Film films
Lost American films
1917 lost films
Lost comedy films
1910s American films